George Ireland (1829 – 15 August 1880) was a 19th-century Member of Parliament from the Southland region of New Zealand.

He died in Wellington. He had represented Benger on the Otago Provincial Council.

References

1829 births
1880 deaths
Members of the New Zealand House of Representatives
New Zealand MPs for South Island electorates
19th-century New Zealand politicians
Members of the Otago Provincial Council